Cryptolithodes expansus is a species of king crab native to the Korean coast and Japan.

See also
 Cryptolithodes typicus
 Cryptolithodes sitchensis

References

External links
 Video of C. expansus

King crabs
Crustaceans described in 1879
Arthropods of Korea
Crustaceans of Japan
Crustaceans of the Pacific Ocean
Taxa named by Edward J. Miers